María Fernanda Villegas Acevedo (born 9 March 1963) is a Chilean theologist and politician.

She was minister of the second government of Michelle Bachelet (2014−2018).

References

External links
 IKnowPolitics Profile

1963 births
Chilean people
Living people
Pontifical Catholic University of Valparaíso alumni
21st-century Chilean politicians
Christian Left (Chile) politicians
Socialist Party of Chile politicians